McLeese Lake, originally Mud Lake, is a lake in the Cariboo region of British Columbia, Canada.  It is located on the Cariboo Highway (British Columbia Highway 97) and is the namesake of the community of the same name.  It was named for Robert McLeese, hotel owner and storekeeper and steamboat owner and MLA (Member of the Legislative Assembly of British Columbia).

References

Lakes of the Cariboo
Cariboo Land District